Eulalia (minor planet designation: 495 Eulalia) is a minor planet orbiting the Sun. Eulalia is very near the 3:1 Jupiter orbital resonance.

It is possible that the disruption of Eulalia's parent body resulted in a mass bombardment of the Earth and Moon 800 million years ago, forming the Copernicus crater on the Moon and involving about 50 times the amount of material of the Chicxulub impact on Earth at the beginning of the Cryogenian geological period.

References

External links 
 Lightcurve plot of 495 Eulalia, Palmer Divide Observatory, B. D. Warner (2012)
 Asteroid Lightcurve Database (LCDB), query form (info )
 Dictionary of Minor Planet Names, Google books
 Asteroids and comets rotation curves, CdR – Observatoire de Genève, Raoul Behrend
 Discovery Circumstances: Numbered Minor Planets (1)-(5000) – Minor Planet Center
 
 

Background asteroids
Eulalia
Eulalia
19021025